Raja Iskandar bin Raja Ziran is the Raja Kecil Tengah of Perak and the fifth in the line of succession to the throne of the Malaysian state of Perak since 27 August 2016.

Honours 
  Grand Knight of the Order of Cura Si Manja Kini (SPCM) – Dato' Seri (2016)

References 

Royal House of Perak
Living people
1941 births